The 411 are  an English girl group comprising Carolyn Owlett, Tisha Martin and Tanya Bryson. Originally a four-piece with Suzie Furlonger, the group was formed in late 2002 after Martin and Boniface sang backing vocals on Lemar's version of Al Green's "Let's Stay Together". The 411 took its name from the Mary J. Blige album What's the 411? (1992). The group released one studio album, Between the Sheets and three top-forty singles before disbanding for the first time in 2005.

The 411 was reformed in 2007 with a new name, Sunshyne, with two new members after Furlonger left a few months before. The band soon changed back to its original name and Furlonger was replaced by Nuala Farrelly, who was a member of Sunshyne. Martin announced in 2008 on her own personal Myspace account that the band had yet again split up but still remained friends and that it would possibly release new material in the near future.

On 6 December 2021, it was announced that the 411 would reunite, originally for a one-off gig at Mighty Hoopla in June 2022 until the group added more gigs for the summer. Furlonger left the group for a second time in July 2022, owing to her busy schedule as a backing vocalist.

History

2003–2005: Formation and Between the Sheets 
In 2002, Tanya Boniface and Tisha Martin — a familiar face at the time after appearing in the children's television shows Kerching! and The Basil Brush Show — recorded backing vocals for the R&B singer Lemar on his cover version of "Let's Stay Together" by Al Green. A woman from Sony Music was in attendance and told them, "You guys sound really nice together. If there were a few more of you we'd be interested in doing something with you." Carolyn Owlett grew up on the same street as Boniface, while Suzie Furlonger completed the line-up after a chance meeting when she visited London for the Notting Hill Carnival; after which the group went to do an audition for Sony, which resulted in  a one-single record deal. The name "The 411" came from 4-1-1, an information line in the United States. Owlett told Newsround, "We thought it'd be cool if people wanted the information on us! And also it's the name of Mary J. Blige's first album and we're big fans!"

The group's first single, "On My Knees", was a hit in the UK (reaching the top 5) and Australia (reaching the top 30), which resulted in an album deal. A second single, "Dumb", reached number 3 in the UK and the top 30 in Australia. These singles appeared on the group's album Between the Sheets, with songs written by Diane Warren, Redeye and The 411 themselves. The group also recorded a cover version of SWV's hit "Weak".

Between the Sheets was also released in France and Japan. The French edition had two new versions of album tracks, recorded specifically for the French market: "Face À Toi Baby" featuring Mag (using the verses from "Dumb" with a special French chorus) and "Chance" featuring K'Maro (a new mix of "Chance" with a French language rap). The Japanese edition of the album had the standard 12 tracks from the UK version with two bonus tracks: "Drop Top Jeans" (which appeared as the B-side to "Teardrops" in the UK) and "Soaking Wet", with an enhanced section featuring the videos for "On My Knees" and "Dumb".

The album was certified Silver on 10 December 2004.

2005–2007: split and reformation as Sunshyne 
After the third single, "Teardrops", missed the UK top 20 and Between the Sheets failed to make the top 40, the 411 were dropped by Sony. In a 2009 interview, Furlonger told Digital Spy, "When the album missed out on the top 40, I think our label just decided that it wasn't worth keeping us anymore." She went on to say, "[Sony] were in the middle of a merger at the time so they were clearing out a lot of their less successful groups and singers. I think if we'd gone to them and literally begged, they might have given us another chance. We could have tried to bring it all back with a fourth single, but I don't think there was anything on the album strong enough to be honest. I think another problem was that we didn't have much publicity. When you look at Girls Aloud or The Saturdays, they're always in the paper. We never had that kind of exposure."

After the band's break-up in 2005, Furlonger worked as backing vocalist for various artists including Paloma Faith, Kevin Rowland, Percy Sledge, Sheila Ferguson, Deniece Williams, Freda Payne, Billy Paul, William Bell, Russell Thompkins Jr., Leon Ware, Take That, Leona Lewis, Julio Iglesias, Bonnie Tyler, James Ingram, Anastacia, Robbie Williams, Roachford, Will Young Beverley Knight, The Shires, Anne Marie, Ella Henderson, Mark Owen, Calum Scott, Simply Red, Peabo Bryson (duetting with him on several occasions) and regularly with Candi Staton and Cliff Richard (who also used her as his duet partner on tour). She was a backing singer for Emeli Sandé. She also performed on shows such as CD:UK, GMTV, The X Factor: Battle of the Stars, T4 on the Beach, the Royal Variety Performance and at Glastonbury 2008 and 2010 with Candi Staton. Furlonger also appeared on The X Factor in 2008 as a solo singer in the Over-25s category, with Dannii Minogue as her mentor. She reached the final 6 but was eliminated from the show on 5 October, having failed to reach the live finals. Since the show, she has signed to Mousse T.'s label, Peppermint Jam, and recorded an album in Germany. She continues to provide backing vocals while in the UK and regularly toured with David Gest, duetting with some of the artists, as well as providing backing vocals for the other artists on The X Factor.

Boniface appeared in the identity parade in the first episode of the 23rd series of Never Mind the Buzzcocks, broadcast on 1 October 2009. She was not correctly identified, Ben Miller ruling her out as a possibility as he thought she was "too young" to have been in a defunct girl band.

In September 2007, Boniface and Martin announced that they were forming a new group called Sunshyne and would be joined by Daizy Agnew and Nuala Farrelly. Daizy soon left and was replaced by Stephanie Barnes.

Sunshyne subsequently split up and Boniface and Martin decided to reform The 411, with the new line-up also including Owlett, who had not been involved in the formation of Sunshyne. The original member Furlonger was not involved, having decided to pursue other avenues, and her place was filled by Nuala Farrelly. However, in 2008, The 411 split up once again.

The band was reformed in 2007 and started recording songs for a second album with the new line-up.

"LoveFool" was to have been the fourth single by The 411 with two new members but it was later cancelled along with the album.

2021–present: reunion and Furlonger's departure 
On 6 December 2021, it was announced that the 411 would reform and perform at Mighty Hoopla on 4 June 2022 with the Sugababes. All four original members were confirmed to be rejoining the band for the performance. Owlett later told Entertainment Focus, "We've been asked for a really long time to get back together, every year for probably the last 15 years. It's funny because my brother is really good friends with Jamie who runs Mighty Hoopla and he kept saying that if you guys get back together we’ll book you. When we were asked about this year we all said let's just do it. It just felt like the right time. We'd all had kids…but they are of an age where now we thought maybe we can pull this together. We said 'yes' to it and I don't think we knew how it would pan out."

Because of her busy schedule as a backing vocalist, Furlonger's departure was announced on 13 July, leaving the group to carry on as a trio.

Although the Mighty Hoopla gig was originally supposed to be a one-off performance, the 411 announced they would perform at the 90s Baby Pop Tour in September and October 2022 with Atomic Kitten, Five and Liberty X. On 7 September the group confirmed it would be performing at the Mighty Hoopla Weekender in January 2023.

Discography

Studio albums

Singles

Tours 
Co-headlining
 Mighty Hoopla (2022)
 90s Baby Pop Tour (2022)
 Mighty Hoopla Weekender  (2023)

Members

Current 
 Tisha Martin (2002–2005, 2008, 2021–present)
 Carolyn Owlett (2002–2005, 2008, 2021–present)
 Tanya Bryson (2002–2005, 2008, 2021–present)

Former 
 Suzie Furlonger(2002–2005, 2021–2022)

References

External links 
Official website
The 411 on Instagram
The 411 on Twitter

British contemporary R&B musical groups
Musical groups established in 2003
Musical groups disestablished in 2008
Musical groups reestablished in 2021
English girl groups
Sony Music UK artists
British R&B girl groups